The Müller-Fokker Effect is a satirical science fiction novel written by John Sladek in 1970. First UK edition was published by Hutchinson with cover design by Bill Botten. It has long been out of print in the United States, having come out in a Pocket Books edition in 1973. A reprint was done in 1990 by Carroll & Graf. The title is a pun with the insult motherfucker, and the book itself is suffused with wordplay of all stripes.

Synopsis
The time is "somewhere in the near future" from the 1970s, and Bob Shairp is a government worker for a project in which a human being's individual qualities can be stored as computer data — on Müller-Fokker tapes.

These reel-to-reel tapes, flesh pink in color, can store an entire person's identity in four tapes. The people recorded on the tapes can be reconstructed by encoding the tapes' data into a virus and infecting someone with that virus (see mind uploading). Of course, that person would have to be backed up too, and a game of musical chairs is set in motion.

Bob Shairp is being recorded for test purposes on the tapes when there is an accident and the chair he is sitting in explodes, destroying his body. Only from the tapes can he be resurrected.

This somewhat conventional science-fiction premise is something of a MacGuffin, as the novel's other major characters struggle to possess the Müller-Fokker tape in numerous subplots that satirize various prominent forces in 1970s America, including the military, evangelism, men's magazines, and radical anticommunist groups such as the John Birch Society. The novel also focuses heavily on parallels between the right-wing politics of Sladek's time and Nazism: one main character is closely based on Adolf Hitler, recast as a semi-literate American racist obsessed with African Americans.

Reception
Locus editor Charles N. Brown described it as "a Vonnegut-type black humor novel that starts out very well but goes on much too long with much too much crammed into it." However, he said "the first 100 pages are really excellent."
Analog Science Fiction and Fact critic P. Schuyler Miller noted "it was like Ron Goulart's farces, only with more cutting edge—let's say, Goulart programmed by a Swift tape."
In 1970 the public reception of the book however was low, and Sladek stopped writing science fiction novels that decade.

Translations

In pop culture
In the comic book series Camelot 3000, a character is seen reading the novel.

Trivia
The book's original blurb reads: "This, and only this, is the genuine novel of our time. Accept no imitations."

Presciently, though in a satirical context, the US president is Ronald Reagan.

The cover of the French translation of the book, published by Editions Opta, includes an image of comic book character Spider-Man shooting heroin.

References

Sources

External links
 

1970 American novels
Satirical books
American science fiction novels
Hutchinson (publisher) books
1970 science fiction novels